The 2009–10 Macedonian Second Football League was the eighteenth season since its establishment. It began on 15 August 2009 and ended on 19 May 2010. Due to the expansion of the league, no teams were relegated that season.

Participating teams

League table

Results

Promotion playoff

See also
2009–10 Macedonian Football Cup
2009–10 Macedonian First Football League

References

External links
Football Federation of Macedonia
MacedonianFootball.com

Macedonia 2
2
Macedonian Second Football League seasons